Najaf Abbas Sial (22 May 1959 – 11 November 2018) was a Pakistani politician who was a member of the National Assembly of Pakistan from June 2013 to May 2018 and a Member of the Provincial Assembly of the Punjab from 2002 to 2013.

Early life and education
Sial was born on 22 May 1959.

He did Bachelors of Arts from Government Emerson College in 1978.

Political career
He was elected to the Provincial Assembly of the Punjab as candidate of Pakistan Muslim League (Q) (PML-Q) from Constituency PP-83 (Jhang-XI) in 2002 Pakistani general election. He received 28,742 votes and defeated an independent candidate, Talib Raza Khan Sial.

He was re-elected to the Provincial Assembly of the Punjab as candidate of PML-Q from Constituency PP-83 (Jhang-XI) in 2008 Pakistani general election. He received 42,366 votes and defeated Muhammad Aoan Abbas, a candidate of Pakistan Muslim League (N) (PML-N).

He was elected to the National Assembly of Pakistan as an independent candidate from Constituency NA-91 (Jhang-III) in 2013 Pakistani general election. He received 91,301 votes and defeated Muhammad Mehboob Sultan, a candidate of PML-N. He joined PML-N in May 2013.

Death
He died on 11 November 2018 in Jhang, Pakistan.

References

Pakistan Muslim League (N) MNAs
Punjabi people
Pakistani MNAs 2013–2018
1959 births
Punjab MPAs 2002–2007
Punjab MPAs 2008–2013
2018 deaths
Government Emerson College alumni